is a Japanese judoka.

Her mother is Japanese and a feng shui master, while her father is Ghanaian.

She started judo at the age of 14.

In 2014, she belonged to Ryotokuji Gakuen after graduating from the university.

She won the silver medal in the middleweight (70 kg) division at the 2014 World Judo Championships.

References

External links
 

1991 births
Living people
People from Funabashi
Japanese female judoka
Japanese people of Ghanaian descent
Sportspeople of Ghanaian descent
21st-century Japanese women